Boxing in the 2010s includes notable events about boxing which occurred between 2010 and 2019. The decade saw high intensity action in the welterweight division. The match between veterans Floyd Mayweather Jr. and Manny Pacquiao broke PPV records. The broadcast of the fight in the Philippines was watched by nearly half the country's households. Mayweather retired at a record 50-0-0 while Pacquiao became the first eight division champion. The middleweight division saw immense action in the later years of the decade. After a draw in 2017, Canelo Alvarez ended Gennady Golovkin's long reign in 2018. The heavyweight division was dominated by Klitschko brothers before Wladimir's loss to Tyson Fury in 2015. Other talents that emerged were Anthony Joshua, Deontay Wilder and undisputed cruiserweight champion Oleksander Usyk.

Lists of notable fights and events by year

2010
January
 January 8 – Roman Karmazin knocks out Dionisio Miranda in the 10th round as part of an IBF middleweight title eliminator. This fight was later named the best middleweight fight of 2010 by Ring magazine.
 January 12 – Jermain Taylor withdraws from the Super Six World Boxing Classic, citing a need to reevaluate his career. Allan Green was made Taylor's replacement in the tournament.
 January 23 – Juan Manuel López knocks out Steven Luevano in the seventh round to become the WBO featherweight champion. This was López's debut at featherweight after vacating his former WBO junior featherweight title. The fight was Luevano's sixth attempt at defending the title.
February
 February 5 – Glen Johnson, at 41 years of age, knocks out Yusaf Mack – ranked as one of top ten light heavyweights in the world – in the sixth round.
 February 13 – Nonito Donaire knocks out Manuel Vargas in the third round to defend his interim WBA world super flyweight title.
March
 March 13 – Manny Pacquiao defeats Joshua Clottey, controlling the fight from start to finish and winning by unanimous decision. This was the first boxing match held at Cowboys Stadium in Arlington, Texas, drawing more than 41,000 people. This was Pacquiao's first defense of his newly awarded WBO welterweight title.
 March 20 – Wladimir Klitschko knocks out Eddie Chambers with a fierce left to the temple with five seconds left in the fight. Chambers was knocked out nearly instantly, collapsing to the canvas and hanging off the last rope. This was Klitschko's first defense of his Ring magazine heavyweight title, his fourth defense of his WBO heavyweight title, and his eighth defense of his IBF and IBO heavyweight titles.
 March 27 – Arthur Abraham is disqualified in the 11th round, to lose to Andre Dirrell. In the fourth round, Abraham was down for the first time in his career, and he was cut over the right eyebrow in the seventh round. The fight was part of the second-group stage of the Super Six World Boxing Classic.
 March 27 – Erik Morales comes out of a nearly 32-month retirement to defeat José Alfaro by unanimous decision and win the WBC international welterweight title.
 March 27 – Pongsaklek Wonjongkam defeats Kōki Kameda by majority decision to win the WBC flyweight title and vacant Ring magazine flyweight title. This is the second time Wonjongkam has become the WBC flyweight champion, first winning the title in March 2001. Wonjongkam had defended the title 17 times before losing to Daisuke Naito in July 2007. This fight is later named the best flyweight fight of 2010 by Ring magazine.
 March 27 – In the co-main event of Wonjongkam/Kameda, Oleydong Sithsamerchai defeats Yasutaka Kuroki by a unanimous decision to retain his WBC strawweight title for the sixth time. This fight was later named the best strawweight fight of 2010 by Ring magazine.
April
 April 3 – Bernard Hopkins defeats Roy Jones Jr. by unanimous decision in a rematch of their May 1993 fight, in which Jones Jr. won the vacant IBF middleweight title. The fight itself got little attention from the boxing media, even though it had been anticipated for many years in the boxing community. Following the rematch, the fight was widely criticized for its heavy use of illegal blows and a skirmish at the end of the sixth round.
 April 3 – David Haye stops John Ruiz in the ninth round after knocking him down four times. This was Haye's first mandatory defense of his newly awarded WBA heavyweight title.
 April 10 – Evander Holyfield, at 47 years of age, knocks out Francois Botha in the eighth round to win the World Boxing Federation heavyweight title.
 April 10 – Andre Berto defeats Carlos Quintana via referee stoppage in the eighth round to retain his WBC welterweight title for the fourth time. This was Berto's first fight since taking a brief hiatus for nearly a year to help in earthquake relief efforts in Haiti as well as to handle personal and family losses from the earthquake. During the fight, Berto injured his left biceps.
 April 10 – Arthur Mercante dies at the age of 90.
 April 17 – Lucian Bute knocks out Edison Miranda with a hard left uppercut in the third round. This was Bute's fifth defense of his IBF super middleweight title.
 April 17 – Kelly Pavlik losses to Sergio Martínez in a close fight for Pavlik's WBC, WBO, and Ring magazine middleweight titles. Martínez controlled the early rounds with quick in and out movements, refusing to heavily engage with Pavlik. Martínez managed to cut Pavlik's left eyebrow in the first round. Pavlik then started to mount a comeback in the middle rounds by blocking Martínez's punches more effectively. Pavlik spent most of his time headhunting trying to land a hard right, which did help Pavlik get a knockdown in the seventh round. In the late rounds Martínez came back and started to open up Pavlik's cuts more, making his face extremely blood. In the post fight interview Pavlik said he couldn't see due to the blood. Martínez ended up winning the fight with a unanimous decision.
 April 19 – Edwin Valero commits suicide at the age of 28. On April 18, Valero was detained on suspicion of killing his 24-year-old wife. The following day, he was found dead in his prison cell, with a picture of his family in his mouth, having hanged himself using the denim pants he was wearing. Valero, who had two occasions where allegations of assault were placed on him in 2009 and 2010 was a subject of some inquiry on his mental health following a motorcycle crash he suffered in 2001.
 April 24 – Mikkel Kessler upsets Carl Froch by a unanimous decision to win Froch's WBC super middleweight title. The fight was part of the second-group stage of the Super Six World Boxing Classic. Following the fight, Froch complained about a judging bias, seeing how the fight was held in Kessler's country of origin, Denmark. This fight was later named the best super middleweight fight of 2010 by Ring magazine.
 April 24 – Tomasz Adamek defeats Chris Arreola by a majority decision. Arreola had his moments and held his own throughout the fight however Adamek had landed more clean punches and accurate combinations throughout the fight. This was Adamek's second defense of his IBF international heavyweight title. This fight was later named the best heavyweight fight of 2010 by Ring magazine.
 April 30 – In a stunning upset, Fernando Montiel knocks out Hozumi Hasegawa, ending his five-year, 10 title defense streak and taking his WBC bantamweight title. The knockout came as a surprise due to Hasegawa seeming to be clearly leading until the end of the fourth, when Montiel landed a left that stunned Hasegawa and pushed him back to the ropes, where he unloaded until the referee stopped the fight.
May
 May 1 – Floyd Mayweather Jr. defeats Shane Mosley to continue his undefeated career streak. Mosley came out strong for the first two rounds—at one point making Mayweather's knees buckle—but Mayweather went on to control the fight.
 May 8 – In a brief fight between Paul Williams and Kermit Cintrón, Cintrón falls out of the ring and is forced by doctors to stop fighting, giving Williams a win by technical decision.
 May 8 – Making his comeback after roughly 15½ months of being suspended, Antonio Margarito defeated Roberto Garcia to win the vacant WBC international super welterweight title.
 May 8 – In a rematch of a 2009 fight, Hugo Cázares defeated Nobuo Nashiro to win the WBA world super flyweight title. This fight is later named the best super flyweight fight of 2010 by Ring magazine.
 May 13 – Manny Pacquiao is officially proclaimed congressman of the lone district of Sarangani.
 May 15 – Amir Khan dominates Paul Malignaggi to win by TKO in the eleventh round and retain his WBA light welterweight title for the second time. This was Khan's debut in the United States.
 May 22 – In their fourth fight against each other Rafael Márquez evens the series to two wins for each man by stopping Israel Vázquez by TKO in the third round.
 May 29 – The WBO decides to strip Sergio Martínez of his middleweight title due to his unclear decision of what weight class he wants to fight in (160lbs or 154lbs). According to WBO bylaws no WBO champion may hold a non-WBO championship in a weight class that is different from the weight class of his WBO championship. Martínez never defended his WBO middleweight title and continued to hold the WBC and Ring magazine middleweight titles as well as the WBC light middleweight title.
June
 June 5 – Miguel Cotto defeats Yuri Foreman by ninth round stoppage due to a leg injury Foreman suffered during the fight. In an amazing display of will, Foreman refused to quit despite being in what he later called a "very sharp pain". A towel was thrown in the ring, but it was ruled to have come from an outside source, and the fight continued for another minute until being stopped officially. This was Cotto's debut at light middleweight. The fight was the first boxing match in the new Yankee stadium built in 2009, and the first match in either Yankee stadium since Ali/Norton 3 in 1976.
 June 19 – Andre Ward defeats Allan Green by unanimous decision. The fight was part of the second-group stage of the Super Six World Boxing Classic.
 June 26 – Julio César Chávez Jr. continues his undefeated streak and improves his record to 41–0 with one draw and one no contest, following a unanimous decision over John Duddy to win the WBC silver middleweight title.
 June 28 – Manny Pacquiao takes his oath of office as a congressman before Supreme Court Associate Justice Antonio T. Carpio in the Provincial Capitol of Sarangani in Municipality of Alabel.
July
 July 10 – Juan Manuel López stops Bernabé Concepción in a second-round TKO to defend his newly awarded WBO featherweight title. The first round of this fight was later named round of the year by Ring magazine.
 July 31 – In a rematch of 2009's fight of the year, Juan Manuel Márquez defeats Juan Díaz for a second time to retain his WBO lightweight title and to win the WBA super world lightweight title.
 July 31 – On the undercard of Márquez/Díaz 2, top-10-ranked lightweight Robert Guerrero defeated Joel Casamayor.
August
 August 7 – Tavoris Cloud defeats Glen Johnson by a unanimous decision. This is Cloud's first defence of his newly awarded IBF light heavyweight title. This fight was later named the best light heavyweight fight of 2010 by Ring magazine.
 August 8 – Devon Alexander wins a decision over Andriy Kotelnyk.
 August 9 – Jay Larkin dies due to a brain tumor at the age of 59.
 August 14 – Jean Pascal upsets Chad Dawson by a technical decision due to an accidental headbutt that caused a major cut over Dawson's right eye and the fight was stopped by the ring side doctor. However Pascal easily won the fight according to the judge's scorecards. Pascal defended his WBC light heavyweight title for the third time, won Dawson's IBO light heavyweight title, and filled the vacant Ring magazine light heavyweight title.
 August 21 – Marco Huck defeats Matt Godfrey by fifth-round TKO, to defend his WBO junior heavyweight title for the fourth time.
 August 25 – Mikkel Kessler withdraws from the Super Six World Boxing Classic, citing an eye injury he suffered in his November 2009 fight against Andre Ward. 41-year-old Glen Johnson was made Kesslers's replacement in the tournament.
 August 28 – Giovanni Segura upsets Iván Calderón by a knockout in the eighth round to win the WBO and WBA super world light flyweight titles. Segura ends Calderón's undefeated 34-fight winning record. This fight would later be named both the best light flyweight and overall fight of the year of 2010 by Ring magazine.
September
 September 4 – Felix Sturm defeats Giovanni Lorenzo by a unanimous decision in his first fight in over a year.
 September 4 – Ricky Burns upsets previously undefeated Román Martínez to end his 24–0 winning streak and win the WBO super featherweight title. This fight is later named the best super featherweight fight of 2010 by Ring magazine.
 September 9 – Floyd Mayweather Jr. is questioned by police after a domestic battery charge is filed against him.
 September 10 – Floyd Mayweather Jr. is taken into custody but is released on $3,000 bail. Initially, Mayweather is only charged with felony theft.
 September 11 – Yuriorkis Gamboa defeats Orlando Salido to unified the WBA world and vacant IBF featherweight titles. Gamboa was knocked down in the eighth round and was docked two points in the twelfth round. While Salido was knocked down twice in the twelfth round.
 September 11 – Wladimir Klitschko defeats Samuel Peter for the second time, in a rematch of their September 2005 fight.
 September 16 – Floyd Mayweather Jr. receives two felony coercion charges and one felony robbery charge added to his felony theft that he received earlier in the week, along with one misdemeanor domestic battery charge and three misdemeanor harassment charges. Collectively, the eight charges leave Mayweather Jr. with potentially up to 34 years in prison.
 September 18 – Shane Mosley vs. Sergio Mora ends in a controversial draw.
 September 18 – Alexander Frenkel knocks out Enzo Maccarinelli in the seventh round to win the EBU cruiserweight title. This fight is later named the best cruiserweight fight of 2010 by Ring magazine.
October
 October 2 – Poonsawat Kratingdaenggym losses to Ryol Li Lee in a stunning upset. This was Kratingdaenggym's first loss since July 2006 against Volodymyr Sydorenko. This fight was later named the best super bantamweight fight of 2010 by Ring magazine.
 October 7 – Andre Dirrell withdraws from the Super Six World Boxing Classic, citing neurological issues. No one was needed to replace Dirrell in the tournament.
 October 15 – In his first fight in more than 16 months Antonio Tarver, former light heavyweight champion, returns as a heavyweight to defeat Nagy Aguilera.
 October 16 – Vitali Klitschko defeats Shannon Briggs by a unanimous decision. This is only the third time Klitschko has won a fight by decision.
November
November 6 – Juan Manuel López defeats Rafael Márquez by TKO, in an exciting fight that was stopped early due to Márquez suffering a shoulder injury following the eighth round. López defends his WBO featherweight title and improves his record to 30–0. This fight is later named the best featherweight fight of 2010 by Ring magazine.
November 6 – As part of the co-main event to López/Márquez, in his Super Six debut Glen Johnson defeats Allan Green in an eighth-round knockout. This was Johnson's first time fighting in the super middleweight division since September 2000 when he defeated Toks Owoh by a sixth-round TKO.
November 6 – Zab Judah continues his comeback by defeating previously unbeaten Lucas Matthysse by a controversial spit decision.
November 13 – David Haye knocks out Olympic gold medalist Audley Harrison in a third-round TKO.
November 13 – Manny Pacquiao defeats Antonio Margarito for the WBC super welterweight title, making Pacquiao the first and so far only boxer to win world titles in eight different weight classes. Following the fight, Margarito is sent to a hospital with a fractured orbital bone, which requires surgery. This is Margarito's first major fight in over 21 months, following a knockout loss to Shane Mosley in January 2009.
November 13 – In the co-main event of Pacquiao/Margarito, Mike Jones defeats Jesús Soto Karass by a unanimous decision. Jones retains his NABA and WBO NABO titles and wins the vacant WBC continental Americas welterweight title. This fight is later named the best welterweight fight of 2010 by Ring magazine.
November 17 – Danny Green defeats BJ Flores by unanimous decision, giving Flores his first career loss.
November 20 – In a highly anticipated rematch, Sergio Martínez knocks out Paul Williams in the second round to retain his WBC and Ring magazine middleweight titles. This fight was later named knockout of the year by Ring magazine.
November 26 – Following a loss in April 2010 that cost Hozumi Hasegawa his WBC bantamweight title, Hasegawa defeats Juan Carlos Burgos to win the vacant WBC featherweight belt.
November 27 – Carl Froch upsets Arthur Abraham by controlling the fight from start to finish to win a unanimous decision. Both boxers were coming off their first losses. The fight was part of the third-group stage of the Super Six World Boxing Classic. Froch regains his WBC super middleweight title that was vacated by Mikkel Kessler.
November 27 – Andre Ward defeats Sakio Bika by unanimous decision. The fight was the first of two non-tournament bout of the Super Six World Boxing Classic. Ward defends his WBA super world super middleweight title for the second time.
November 27 – Juan Manuel Márquez defeats Michael Katsidis by ninth-round TKO. Katsidis was competitive throughout the fight and even scored a knockdown on Márquez in the third round, While Márquez fought a more solid fight, landing many combinations. Márquez defends his WBO, WBA, and Ring magazine lightweight titles. This fight is later named the best lightweight fight of 2010 by Ring magazine.
November 27 – Dispute being a heavy underdog, Jason Litzau upsets Celestino Caballero via split decision. The fight, part of the Márquez/Katsidis undercard, was later named upset of the year by Ring magazine.
November 27 – Miguel Vazquez defeats Ricardo Dominguez by unanimous decision to defend his newly awarded IBF lightweight title.
December
 December 4 – Paweł Wolak knocks out Jose Pinzon in the seventh round. This fight is later named the best junior middleweight fight of 2010 by Ring magazine.
 December 8 – A judge issues an arrest warrant for Floyd Mayweather Jr. stemming from a November 15 incident where Mayweather allegedly poked a security guard in the face several times over parking tickets.
 December 11 – Amir Khan defeats Marcos Maidana in a relatively close decision. Khan came out strong in the early part of the fight by applying heavy pressure on Maidana and getting a knockdown late in the first round. However, in the later parts of the fight, Khan spent much of his time avoiding Maidana, trying to endure through rounds. At one point, Maidana appeared to have almost finished Khan in the tenth round, when he landed a huge punch. But Khan absorbs the punishment and does enough to win by unanimous decision. Khan defends his WBA world light welterweight title for the third time. This fight is later named the best light welterweight fight of 2010 by Ring magazine. It is also awarded Fight of the Year by the Boxing Writers Association of America.
 December 11 – In the co-main event of Khan/Maidana, Victor Ortiz and Lamont Peterson settle with a somewhat controversial majority draw after ten rounds of boxing.
 December 11 – Abner Mares defeats Vic Darchinyan by split decision to start Showtime's second boxing tournament based on the Super Six World Boxing Classic. However instead featured only four fighters, a single elimination format, and was focused on the bantamweight division at 118 lbs (54 kg) under the title, The Bantamweight Tournament: Winner Takes All. This fight was later named the best bantamweight fight of 2010 by Ring magazine.
 December 11 – Following Mares/Darchinyan, Joseph Agbeko defeated Yonnhy Pérez in a rematch of their October 2009 fight in which Pérez defeated Agbeko.
 December 18 – Marco Huck continues his reign as WBO junior heavyweight champion by defeating Denis Lebedev by split decision.
 December 18 – Bernard Hopkins vs. Jean Pascal ends in a controversial majority draw.  Pascal scores two flash knockdowns early, putting Hopkins on the canvas for the first time in more than a decade.  The older fighter then adjusts and dominates most of the fight.
 December 23 – Hugo Cázares defeats Hiroyuki Hisataka by a unanimous decision to retain his WBA super flyweight title for the third time.
 December 28 – "Bad" Bennie Briscoe dies at the age of 67.

2011
January
 January 4 – Southern Highlands homeowners association files a lawsuit to the Clark County District Court seeking $10,000 in damages and an injunction against Floyd Mayweather Jr. This comes in addition to numerous other charges Mayweather Jr. is facing, including domestic battery, theft, coercion, robbery, and harassment.
 January 29 – Timothy Bradley defeats Devon Alexander by a tenth round technical decision. The fight was stopped due to a cut Alexander had received from an accidental headbutt in the third round, which was made worse by two more headbutts in the eighth round and a final, fourth headbutt in the tenth. Both fighters came in with undefeated records, and the fight was initially praised as one of the few good match-ups between two top-ranked Americans in recent years. With the win, Bradley unified the light welterweight titles by defending his WBO title and winning Alexander's WBC title.
February
 February 4 – Sergio Mora losses to Brian Vera by controversial split decision. Vera had lost four of his last six fights.
 February 5 – Tomás Rojas defends his WBC super flyweight title for the first time, defeating Nobuo Nashiro in an exciting, back-and-forth fight.
 February 12 – Arthur Abraham defeats Stjepan Božić by an official second-round technical knockout. The fight was stopped after Božić punched Abraham's elbow and fractured his hand.
 February 15 – Manny Pacquiao visited the American capital of Washington during a press tour to have meetings with President Barack Obama and Nevada Senator Harry Reid.
 February 19 – Nonito Donaire defeats Fernando Montiel by technical knockout in the second round to unify the WBO and WBC bantamweight titles. Donaire started the fight strong by controlling most of the first round, landing a left hook that briefly stunned Montiel. In the second round, Donaire started landing a few combinations before finishing Montiel with a solid hook.
 February 19 – In the co-main event of Montiel/Donaire, a rematch against up-and-comer Mike Jones and Jesus Soto Karass. The first bout against the two boxers back in November 2010 for the co-main event to Pacquiao/Margarito ended in a controversial majority decision for Jones. In the rematch however, Jones controlled most of this fight, cutting Soto Karass over both eyes in the third round to win a strong unanimous decision.
 February 26 – Brandon Rios knocks out Miguel Acosta in the tenth round, to win the WBA world lightweight title. Acosta started the fight strong by controlling most of the early rounds. However a left hand to the body followed by a short jab caught Acosta in the sixth round and forced a knockdown. Acosta then appeared to be to have regained himself in the seventh round, just to be knocked down again in the eighth. The fight then ended with back-and-forth action from both fighters, with Rios landing three right hands to finish Ascota in the tenth.
March
 March 5 – Saúl Álvarez defeats Matthew Hatton by unanimous decision to become the WBC light middleweight champion.
 March 12 – Sergio Martínez knocks out undefeated Sergiy Dzindziruk in the eighth round to win the vacant WBC middleweight diamond belt.
 March 12 – Miguel Cotto knocks out Ricardo Mayorga in the twelfth round to retain his WBA world light middleweight title.
 March 12 – Yuri Foreman is knocked out by Paweł Wolak at the end of the sixth round. This was Foreman's first fight since coming off knee surgery following his fight with Miguel Cotto.
 March 19 – Vitali Klitschko knocks out Odlanier Solís in the first round to retain his WBC heavyweight title for the sixth time. The knockout came as a surprise after Solís appeared to sustain a serious knee injury. Initially, Klitschko was angry at Solís, thinking he'd taken a dive. However, Solís was taken to a hospital, where a scan revealed tears to his anterior cruciate ligament and external meniscus and cartilage damage in his right knee.
 March 19 – Lucian Bute knocks out Brian Magee in the tenth round to defend his IBF supper middleweight title for the seventh time.
 March 26 – Yuriorkis Gamboa knocks out Jorge Solis in the fourth round for the IBF and WBA world featherweight titles.
April
 April 2 – Giovanni Segura knocks out Iván Calderón in the third round in a repeat of 2010's fight of the year.
 April 8 – Marco Antonio Rubio upsets top-ranked prospect David Lemieux by seventh-round TKO.
 April 8 – Experienced veteran Jhonny González upsets the top-ranked Hozumi Hasegawa in a fourth-round TKO to win his WBC featherweight title. This was Hasegawa's second fight at featherweight since moving from bantamweight in late 2010.
 April 9 – Marcos Maidana defeats Erik Morales by majority decision to become the interim WBA light welterweight champion again.
 April 9 – In the co-main event to Maidana/Morales, Robert Guerrero defeats Michael Katsidis by unanimous decision. Guerrero wins the interim WBO and WBA world lightweight titles.
 April 16 – Amir Khan defeats Paul McCloskey by technical decision in round 6. McCloskey was cut by a clash of heads, and the bout was stopped by the ringside doctor.
 April 16 – Victor Ortiz defeats Andre Berto, by unanimous decision, to win the WBC Welterweight title and end Berto's undefeated record.
 April 16 – Orlando Salido defeats Juan Manuel Lopez by technical knockout of the 8th round.  This puts an end to Lopez's undefeated record and an end to a potential unification bout with Yuriorkis Gamboa.
 April 23 – Vic Darchinyan defeats Yonnhy Perez.
May
 May 1 – Henry Cooper dies at the age of 76.
 May 7 – Manny Pacquiao defeats Shane Mosley by unanimous decision to retain his WBO welterweight title.
 May 7 – Also on the Pacquiao/Mosley card, Kelly Pavlik defeats Alfonso López via majority decision. This was Pavlik's first fight in over a year after being defeated by Sergio Martínez and losing his Ring magazine, WBC, and WBO middleweight titles. It was also Pavlik's debut at super middleweight.
 May 7 – At 48 years old, Evander Holyfield knocks out 46-year-old Brian Nielsen in the tenth round.
 May 7 – Daniel Geale upsets Sebastian Sylvester by split decision.
 May 8 – Lionel Rose dies at the age of 62.
 May 14 – Andre Ward defeats Arthur Abraham by unanimous decision to retain his WBA Super World Super Middleweight title. The win advanced him to the Finals of the Super Six tournament.
 May 21 – Bernard Hopkins defeats Jean Pascal. Hopkins, at age 46, becomes the oldest man in the history of boxing to win a major world title, supplanting George Foreman, who had previously held the distinction after his knockout victory over Michael Moorer.
 May 21 – As part of the Hopkins/Pascal card, Chad Dawson defeats Adrian Diaconu nine months after his loss to Pascal. It was Dawson's first fight under Hall of Fame trainer Emanuel Steward.
 May 21 – Denis Lebedev brutally knocks out Roy Jones Jr. in the 10th round. Jones falls face first to the canvas and is unconscious for several minutes.
June
 June 4 – Julio Cesar Chavez Jr. defeats Sebastian Zbik by majority decision to capture the WBC Middleweight title and become the first Mexican to win a major title in the middleweight division.
 June 4 – Carl Froch defeats Glen Johnson by majority decision to retain his WBC Super Middleweight title and position himself to face Andre Ward in the Super Six finals.
 June 18 – Saul Alvarez defeats Ryan Rhodes by technical knockout of the 12th round to successfully defends his WBC title for the first time.
 June 25 – Felix Sturm defeats Matthew Macklin in an extremely close and controversial split decision to retain his WBA super world middleweight title.
 June 25 – Devon Alexander defeats Lucas Matthysse in a close split decision.
 June 25 – In the co-main event of Alexander/Matthysse, Tavoris Cloud knocks out Yusaf Mack at the end of the eighth round to improve to 22–0 and defend his IBF light heavyweight title for the third time.
 June 25 – Also on the same card as Alexander/Matthysse, Cornelius Bundrage upsets Sechew Powell by unanimous decision to defend his newly awarded IBF light middleweight title for the first time.
July
 July 2 – Wladimir Klitschko defeats David Haye by unanimous decision. Klitschko, already the holder of four heavyweight championships, adds Haye's WBA title to his collection.
 July 2 – Following his upset lost to Jason Litzau, Celestino Caballero losses another split decision to Jonathan Victor Barros.
 July 9 – Brandon Ríos knocks out Urbano Antillón in the third round.
 July 9 – Top-ranked Akifumi Shimoda is knocked out by Rico Ramos in a huge upset.
 July 9 – Paul Williams defeats Erislandy Lara in a highly disputed decision.
 July 16 – In a stunning upset, John Murray is knocked out by Kevin Mitchell in the eighth round.
 July 20 – Antonio Tarver stops Danny Green in the ninth round to win the IBO cruiserweight title.
 July 23 – Amir Khan knocks out Zab Judah in the fifth round.
August
 August 13 – Abner Mares wins a highly disputed majority decision over Joseph Agbeko.
 August 13 – Kimbo Slice makes his boxing debut with a 17-second knockout of James Wade.
 August 19 – Suriyan Sor Rungvisai wins a decision over Tomas Rojas to win WBC title.
 August 27 – Alexander Povetkin defeats Ruslan Chagaev by decision.
 August 27 – Raul Garcia losses a split decision to prospect Moises Fuentes to lose his WBO minimumweight title.
 August 31 – Hugo Fidel Cazares losses a split decision to Tomonobu Shimizu and WBA title. 
September
 September 3 – Andre Berto stops Dejan Zavec at the end of the fifth round by a medical stoppage after Zavec's right eye closed and suffered a serious cut.
 September 10 – Vitali Klitschko knocks out Tomasz Adamek in the tenth round.
 September 10 – Yuriorkis Gamboa wins a technical decision over Daniel Ponce de Leon.
 September 10 – Juan Carlos Salgado wins a decision over Argenis Mendez for the vacant IBF title.
 September 17 – Saul Alvarez knocks out Alfonso Gomez in the sixth round.
 September 17 – Floyd Mayweather Jr. knocks out Victor Ortiz in what many deemed a sucker punch in the fourth round to remain undefeated.
October
 October 1 – Andy Lee wins a decision over Brian Vera.
 October 1 – Sergio Martinez knocks out Darren Barker in the 11th round.
 October 1 – Toshiaki Nishioka wins a decision over Rafael Marquez to defend WBC super bantamweight title.
 October 1 – Karo Murat versus Gabriel Campillo ends in a split draw.
 October 1 – Yoan Pablo Hernandez wins a technical decision over Steve Cunningham.
 October 8 – Donnie Nietes defeats Ramon Garcia Hirales for WBO light flyweight title.
 October 8 – English prospect Kell Brook knocks out Rafal Jackiewicz in the sixth round.
 October 15 – In what is later changed to a No Contest, Bernard Hopkins is unable to continue after injuring his shoulder in the 2nd round of a light heavyweight fight with Chad Dawson.  Dawson was initially awarded a knockout victory.
 October 15 – Kimbo Slice scores his second career knockout, stopping Tay Bledsoe in just under two minutes.
 October 21 – Pongsaklek Wonjongkam defeats Edgar Sosa to defend his WBC flyweight title.
 October 22 – Nonito Donaire wins a one-sided decision over Omar Andres Narvaez
 October 22 – Miguel Acosta losses a decision against Richard Abril in a big upset. 
 October 29 – Hernan Marquez knocks out Luis Concepcion in the first round to defend the WBA belt.
November
 November 4 – Suriyan Sor Rungvisai wins a decision over Nobuo Nashiro.
 November 4 – Denis Lebedev wins a one-sided decision over James Toney.
 November 5 – Ricky Burns wins a decision over Michael Katsidis.
 November 5 – James Kirkland wins a major upset by knocking out Alfredo Angulo in the sixth round.
 November 5 – Lucian Bute wins a one-sided decision over veteran Glen Johnson.
 November 7 – Joe Frazier dies due to liver cancer.

2012
 May 5 – Floyd Mayweather Jr. defeats Miguel Cotto by unanimous decision.
 June 9 – Timothy Bradley defeats Manny Pacquiao by split decision.
 September 15 – Sergio Martínez defeats Julio Cesar Chavez Jr. by unanimous decision.
 December 8 – Juan Manuel Márquez knocks out Manny Pacquiao in the 6th round.

2013
May 4 - Floyd Mayweather Jr. defeats Robert Guerrero by unanimous decision.
September 14 - Floyd Mayweather Jr. defeats Canelo Álvarez by majority decision.
October 12 - Timothy Bradley defeats Juan Manuel Márquez by split decision.

2014
 January 18 - Jean Pascal defeats Lucian Bute by unanimous decision to win the vacant WBC Diamond Heavyweight championship.
 April 12 – Manny Pacquiao defeats Timothy Bradley by unanimous decision.
 May 3 – Floyd Mayweather Jr. defeats Marcos Maidana by majority decision.
 June 7 – Miguel Cotto stops Sergio Martínez in the 10th round.
 September 13 – Floyd Mayweather Jr. defeats Marcos Maidana by unanimous decision.

2015
 May 2 – Floyd Mayweather Jr. defeats Manny Pacquiao by unanimous decision to remain undefeated.
 November 21 – Canelo Álvarez defeats Miguel Cotto by unanimous decision.
 November 28 - Wladimir Klitschko is defeated by British boxer Tyson Fury by unanimous decision, ending an almost decade-long reign as the Heavyweight Champion of the World.

2016
April 9 - Manny Pacquiao defeats Timothy Bradley by unanimous decision.
May 7 - Canelo Álvarez knocks out Amir Khan in the 6th round.
June 3 - Muhammad Ali dies at the age of 74 from septic shock due to unspecified natural causes.

2017
April 29 - Anthony Joshua stops Wladimir Klitschko in the 11th round.
May 6 - Canelo Álvarez defeats Julio Cesar Chavez Jr. by unanimous decision.
July 2 - Jeff Horn defeats Manny Pacquiao by unanimous decision to retain the WBO welterweight title.
August 26 - Floyd Mayweather Jr. stops UFC fighter Conor McGregor in the 10th round to become 50–0.
September 16 - The highly anticipated middleweight title fight between Gennady Golovkin and Canelo Álvarez ends in a draw.

2018
July 21 - Oleksandr Usyk defeats Murat Gassiev by unanimous decision to become the first undisputed cruiserweight champion in the four belt era,
at the 2017-18 World Boxing Super Series - cruiserweight division
September 15 - Canelo Alvarez defeats Gennady Golovkin by majority decision in a rematch to win the WBO and WBC middleweight titles.
September 22 - Anthony Joshua defeats Alexander Povetkin by TKO in the seventh round.
December 1 - The highly anticipated match between Deontay Wilder and Tyson Fury ends in a draw.

2019
March 16 - Welterweight champion Errol Spence Jr. defeats lightweight champion Mikey Garcia by a unanimous decision.
June 1, 2019 - Late replacement Andy Ruiz Jr. upset undefeated Anthony Joshua at the Madison Square Garden, and became the new unified heavyweight champion. 
July 20, 2019- Manny Pacquaio beats Keith Thurman by split decision at the MGM Grand Garden Arena, becoming the oldest welterweight champion at the age of 40.
December 7, 2019 - Anthony Joshua regains titles by beating Andy Ruiz Jr. in a rematch.

References

External links
"Boxing360 – Professional Boxing Promoter, New York City", Boxing.

 2010s
2010s in sports
 
2010s timelines